Eupithecia dominaria is a moth in the family Geometridae. It is found in Tajikistan.

References

Moths described in 1956
dominaria
Moths of Asia